This discography documents albums and singles released by American R&B/soul singer Brenda Russell.

Studio albums

Compilation albums

Singles

Guest singles

Music videos

References

Discographies of American artists